Anthony Francis Malinosky (October 7, 1909 – February 8, 2011) was an American baseball player. He played third baseman and shortstop in Major League baseball in 35 games for the Brooklyn Dodgers in the  season. Listed at 5' 10", Weight: 165 lb., he batted and threw right-handed.

Born in Collinsville, Illinois, Tony Malinosky attended Whittier College, where he played baseball and was a classmate of future US President Richard Nixon.

The Pittsburgh Pirates signed Malinosky to his first professional contract, and then sold his rights to the Dodgers in 1936.

During World War II, Malinosky was drafted by the United States Army, with which he saw combat in the Battle of the Bulge.

The Los Angeles Dodgers honored Malinosky at Dodger Stadium in 2009, on the occasion of his 100th birthday.  In a statement released after his death, the Dodgers said "Tony lived an incredibly full life, both on and off the field,  He remained a Dodger fan his whole life and his visit to Dodger Stadium in 2009 gave the organization a great opportunity to celebrate not only his 100th birthday, but the Dodger chapter of his life that meant so much to him. He will be most certainly missed by all who knew him."

Malinosky was a longtime resident of Oxnard, California since moving to the area in 1976. At , he was the oldest living former Major League Baseball player at the time of his death on February 8, 2011.

See also

List of centenarians (Major League Baseball players)
List of centenarians (sportspeople)

Sources

External links

Retrosheet
Interview with Malinosky from October 2009 at KCLU.ORG

1909 births
2011 deaths
American centenarians
Men centenarians
Major League Baseball infielders
Brooklyn Dodgers players
Birmingham Barons players
Columbus Red Birds players
Houston Buffaloes players
Little Rock Travelers players
Louisville Colonels (minor league) players
Rochester Red Wings players
Sacramento Solons players
Tulsa Oilers (baseball) players
Waco Cubs players
United States Army personnel of World War II
Whittier Poets baseball players
Baseball players from Illinois
People from Collinsville, Illinois
Sportspeople from Oxnard, California
Sportspeople from Ventura County, California
United States Army soldiers